Andrew Kwadjo Osei-Bonsu (born 4 January 1999) is an English professional footballer who plays as a midfielder for Yaxley. He was previously an academy scholar of Milton Keynes Dons, and featured for the club's first team in the EFL Cup and EFL Trophy.

Club career

Milton Keynes Dons
Osei-Bonsu joined Milton Keynes Dons' academy at a young age, progressing through various age groups and into the club's development squad. On 9 August 2016, Osei-Bonsu made his professional debut for the first team, playing the full 90 minutes in a 2–3 EFL Cup first round away win against Newport County. At the end of the 2016–17 season, he was one of several academy scholars released by the club.

Larne
Following brief spells with Wealdstone, Dunstable Town, and trials with Derby County and Huddersfield Town, Osei-Bonsu joined Irish NIFL Championship club Larne on 8 June 2018. Following limited first team opportunities due to injury, he left the club by mutual consent in December 2018 having made six appearances.

St Ives Town
On 15 January 2019, Osei-Bonsu joined St Ives Town. He left the club on 13 September 2019 due to limited playing time in the 2019-20 after the arrival of a new forward.

Billericay Town
On 14 November 2019, Billericay Town announced the arrival of Osei-Bonsu.

East Fife
In August 2021, Osei-Bonsu signed for Scottish League One side East Fife. In December 2021, Osei-Bonsu was released from his contract.

St Ives Town (second spell)
On 4 March 2022, Osei-Bonsu once again signed for Southern League side St Ives Town.

Royston Town
In October 2022, Osei-Bonsu signed for Royston Town.

Yaxley
By January 2023 he was playing for Yaxley, scoring on his debut for the club.

Personal life
Osei-Bonsu is of Ghanaian descent.

Career statistics

References

1999 births
Living people
English footballers
People from Milton Keynes
Footballers from Buckinghamshire
Association football defenders
Milton Keynes Dons F.C. players
Dunstable Town F.C. players
Wealdstone F.C. players
Larne F.C. players
St Ives Town F.C. players
Billericay Town F.C. players
East Fife F.C. players
Royston Town F.C. players
NIFL Championship players
Southern Football League players
Scottish Professional Football League players
English Football League players
Yaxley F.C. players
English sportspeople of Ghanaian descent
Black British sportspeople